WDSD (94.7 FM) is a commercial FM radio station licensed to serve Dover, Delaware. The station is owned by iHeartMedia, Inc. and broadcasts a country format.

WDSD broadcasts some sporting events, including NASCAR races, and is the flagship station for University of Delaware athletics. Some UD events are broadcast on sister station Fox Sports 1290 in Wilmington.

The station has been assigned the WDSD call sign by the Federal Communications Commission since September 7, 2007, when it swapped call signs with sister station WRDX.

WDSD uses HD Radio.

References

External links
 
 

DSD
Country radio stations in the United States
IHeartMedia radio stations